The 1936 United States Senate election in Maine was held on September 14, 1936. Incumbent Republican U.S. Senator Wallace White was re-elected to a second term over Governor Louis J. Brann.

Although 1936 is typically seen as the end of Maine's status as a national bellwether, White's narrow victory in strongly Republican Maine may have been a portent of doom for Alf Landon's fall presidential campaign, in which he carried only Maine and nearby Vermont.

Republican primary

Candidates
Wallace H. White Jr., incumbent Senator since 1931

Results
Senator White was unopposed for re-nomination.

Democratic primary

Candidates
Louis J. Brann, Governor of Maine since 1933

Results
Governor Brann was unopposed for the Democratic nomination.

General election

Results

See also 
 1936 United States Senate elections

References

Notes

Maine
1936